Hand in Hand may refer to:

Film and TV
 Hand in Hand (film), a 1960 film
 Hand in Hand (Ugandan TV series), a Ugandan soap opera promoting the benefits of vocational training
 Hand in Hand (Singaporean TV series), a Singaporean drama series about kinship
 Hand in Hand: A Benefit for Hurricane Relief, a September 2017 telethon

Music
 Hand in Hand (The Winter album), a 2007 album by beFour
 Hand in Hand (Mulgrew Miller album), 1992

Songs
 "Hand in Hand", the anthem of football club Feyenoord
 "Hand in Hand" (Olympic theme song), of the 1988 Summer Olympics
 "Hand in Hand", a song by Celine Dion, being a German version of her French song "Ne partez pas sans moi"
 A song on both the Kingdom Hearts Original Soundtrack, and the Kingdom Hearts II Original Soundtrack
 "Hand in Hand" (Elvis Costello song), 1978
 "Hand in Hand", a song by Dire Straits from Making Movies, 1980
 "Hand in Hand", a song by Phil Collins from Face Value, 1981
 "Hand in Hand", a song by the Vels from House of Miracles
 "Hand in Hand" (Grace song), 1997
 "Hand in Hand" (DJ Quik song), 1998
 "Hand in Hand" (Beatsteaks song), 2004
 "Hand in Hand" (beFour song), 2007
 "Hand in Hand" (Julian Le Play song), 2016
 "Hand in Hand", a song by Paul McCartney from Egypt Station, 2018
 "Hand in Hand", a 2014 song by Kraftklub

Other uses
 Hand in Hand, an anthology of love poems edited by Carol Ann Duffy
 The Hand in Hand Fire & Life Insurance Society, founded in London in 1696
 Hand in Hand: Center for Jewish-Arab Education in Israel, a network of integrated, bilingual schools for Jewish and Arab children in Israel